In algebraic geometry, a Tango bundle is one of the indecomposable vector bundles of rank n − 1 constructed on n-dimensional projective space Pn by

References

Algebraic geometry
Vector bundles